Apoorvanand is professor at the Hindi Department, Faculty of Arts, University of Delhi. He is also a regular columnist and political commentator. He is known for his frequent interventions in day-to-day politics. He claimed in his video that Delhi riots should be seen by lens of communal with all responsibility on Hindus criticizing Delhi CM over calling names of Hindu victims.

Early life and education
Apoorvanand was born in Muzaffarpur, Bihar, grew up in Siwan and received his undergraduate education from Bihar University. He earned his Masters and Ph.D. from Patna University. He currently teaches Hindi at University of Delhi.

Academic career
Prof. Apoorvanand started his teaching career at T.P.S. College, Patna, a constituent unit of Magadh University. In 1999, he was invited to join Mahatma Gandhi Antarrashtriya Hindi Vishwavidyalaya, a Central University set up by the Government of India, and was instrumental in developing the University's vision plan and first academic programs. In 2004, he joined the Hindi Department at the University of Delhi where he was instrumental in redesigning the department's academic program.

Published works
He had authored or edited the following books:
Sundar Ka Swapna (New Delhi: Vani Prakashan, 2001) 
Sahitya Ka Ekant (New Delhi: Vani Prakashan, 2008)
The Idea of a University (Chennai: Context, 2018)
Education at the Crossroads (New Delhi: Niyogi Books, 2018)

Political commentator 
His critical essays have appeared in all major Hindi journals. Apart from his academic and literary writings, he also contributes columns in Indian Newspapers and magazines on the issues of education, culture, communalism, violence and human rights both in Hindi and also in English. He is a regular columnist at The Indian Express and The Wire.    He also frequently writes on other platforms such as Scroll, Satya Hindi, Al Jazeera, The Kochi Post.     He at times also appears on Indian television as a panelist on issues concerning Higher Education, language and communal-ism.

Role in 2020 Delhi riots 
On 12 September 2020, he along with Sitaram Yechuri, Yogendra Yadav and others was named in the supplementary chargesheet  by Delhi Police for his alleged role in 2020 Delhi riots.

References

Further reading

Living people
Academic staff of Delhi University
People from Siwan, Bihar
Patna University alumni
Year of birth missing (living people)